The Pottsville Maroons were an American football team based in Pottsville, Pennsylvania, in the northeastern part of the state. Founded in 1920, they played in the National Football League (NFL) from 1925 to 1928. In 1929 they relocated to Boston, where they played one season as the Boston Bulldogs.

The team was founded as the Pottsville Eleven, an independent team playing in the local eastern Pennsylvania circuit. Home games were played at Minersville Park, a high school stadium in nearby Minersville. They joined the local Anthracite League in 1924, the same year they adopted the "Maroons" nickname, and won the league title. The next season they joined the NFL under owner John G. Streigel. Though dominant on the field, a controversial suspension cost them the 1925 NFL Championship. They were reinstated the following year, but after two successive losing seasons in 1927 and 1928, Streigel sold the Maroons to a group in Boston, where they played one season before folding.

1925 was their best season. The 1928 roster included three future Pro Football Hall of Fame members – Johnny "Blood" McNally, Walt Kiesling, and coach Wilbur "Pete" Henry – but posted the worst record in franchise history.  Writer John O'Hara, who would go on to become a world-famous novelist with Appointment in Samarra, covered the team for the local newspaper, the Pottsville Republican.

History

Origins
Like other coal towns in eastern Pennsylvania, Pottsville had been fielding football teams from at least the 1910s. The team that became the Maroons was established in 1920 as the Pottsville Eleven, and had a roster mostly made up of firemen from the Yorkville Hose Company. The team was initially unaffiliated with any league, playing on the independent circuit against other teams from the coal mining towns of eastern Pennsylvania. In 1922 the team attracted the sponsorship of area businessmen Harold Kingsbury, Irvin Heinz and Frank Schoeneman, who brought in talented professional players such as Carl Beck, Benny Boynton and Stan Cofall. Still, the team maintained a strong local presence by recruiting many Pottsville natives to its roster. The result was a team with consistent winning records and strong crowds.

Anthracite League
In 1924 local surgeon John G. "Doc" Striegel purchased the Pottsville Eleven for $1,500. That year teams in the local circuit decided to form a league, which became known as the Anthracite League. This was also the year the team adopted the Maroons name; according to legend, the team placed an order for new football jerseys with local sporting goods supplier Joe Zacko, telling him that the color was not important. Zacko sent them twenty-five maroon jerseys, giving birth to the name.

During the 1924 Anthracite League season, the Maroons added three members of the NFL's 1923 Canton Bulldogs championship team to their roster. These players were Larry Conover, Harry Robb and future Hall of Fame inductee Wilbur "Pete" Henry. NFL President Joseph Carr was not pleased to see stars like Henry deserting the league to play for an independent coal region team, but there was little he could do about it unless Pottsville joined the league. A suit filed by Henry's former NFL team was thrown out on a technicality by a Pennsylvania judge. The Maroons then posted a 6–0–1 record against Anthracite League teams and clinched the league title that November with a victory over Coaldale.

Immediately after winning the Anthracite League title, the Maroons issued challenges to both the NFL champion Cleveland Bulldogs and the Frankford Yellow Jackets, who claimed the Eastern professional championship. When neither team accepted, Striegel scheduled a game with the NFL's Rochester Jeffersons, who had not beaten an NFL opponent since 1921. These two teams met in a season finale on the last Sunday of November. Rochester managed to defeat Pottsville 10–7, giving the Maroons their only loss of the season. However Pottsville ended its 1924 season with an overall record of 12–1–1, scoring 288 points and allowing only 17 while capturing the Anthracite League title.

NFL
The Anthracite League collapsed after the season, but Striegel and the Maroons were undeterred. They applied for, and received, a franchise in the NFL. This was somewhat unusual, as the team's Minersville Park was a relatively small high school field; the league administration may have been attracted by the favorable logistics of a second team near the Frankford Yellow Jackets in Philadelphia. Pennsylvania's blue laws, which prohibited football on Sundays in Philadelphia, were simply not followed in Pottsville, allowing traveling teams to play the Yellowjackets on a Saturday and then head to Pottsville on Sunday.

Since many Maroons players moved back to their NFL teams in 1925, the Maroons recruited several talented players to replace them. These included former Army great Walter French and Jack Ernst, a quarterback from Lafayette College. Another Army recruit, end Eddie Doyle, later served in World War II and was the first American killed in the landings in North Africa. Topping this collection of stars was Charlie Berry, possibly the best athlete on the team; after a spectacular athletic career at Lafayette College, he signed both pro baseball and pro football contracts. However, this strong talent was expensive, and difficult to make up even with sellout crowds at little Minersville Park.

During this time the Maroons insisted that their players live in the Pottsville area. During the 1920s most players had to travel great distances from their homes and only joined their teams on game day. By having the players live in Pottsville, coach and former Colgate University assistant Dick Rauch instituted regular practices for his players. This helped the Maroons to a 28–0 win over the Buffalo Bisons in their first NFL game. When not practicing, the Maroons spent their days hanging around the fire house, drinking Yuengling, playing cards and tossing footballs in the street. The Maroons then jumped out to a 9–1–1 record. However some believe that having visiting teams play Frankford the day before the Maroons benefited the team. Pottsville was 5–1–0 in their six games against teams that played the Yellow Jackets the previous day. On the first snap of the game against the Chicago Bears, the Pottsville players knocked football legend Red Grange out cold. Grange soon recovered from the hit, only to be knocked out again. Immediately Grange said "The hell with (the $500 owed to him for the one game), it ain't worth it." He then proceeded to walk off the field. The team's only loss in 1925 came from a 20–0 upset to the Yellow Jackets. However, in the second meeting of the two teams, the Maroons beat Frankford 49–0.

By this point in the season, Pottsville and the Chicago Cardinals (now the Arizona Cardinals) were the two top teams in the league, having comparable records. At the time, the NFL Championship went to the team with the best record against other NFL teams. As such, the match-up between the two was of great importance. The Maroons met the Cardinals in late November near the end of the season for a game at Chicago's Comiskey Park, under snowy conditions. The Maroons won the game 21–7, thereby putting them ahead of the Cardinals in the championship race.

1925 NFL Championship controversy

Before the season ended, however, the Maroons were suspended by NFL commissioner Joseph Carr, thus denying them the championship title. This has been the subject of controversy ever since.

Earlier in the year, the Frankford Yellow Jackets had scheduled an exhibition game between a team of former University of Notre Dame stars and the best NFL team in the east. As the NFL's dominant eastern team at the time, they believed they themselves would get to play the potentially lucrative match against the "Notre Dame All-Stars". However, when Pottsville later pulled ahead in the standings, they won the right to play the All-Stars. As Pottsville's Minersville Park was a high school stadium with a capacity of only around 6,000, team owner John Streigel booked the much larger Shibe Park in Philadelphia for the big game. Philadelphia, though, was within the Yellow Jackets' designated territory, and Frankford complained to the league. Commissioner Carr warned Streigel several times that Pottsville's franchise would be suspended if they played in Philadelphia.

Not wanting to give up on a potential financial windfall for his team, Streigel went ahead with the game. He would later claim he had received verbal permission from the NFL by telephone, though he gave inconsistent responses as to which official he had spoken to. The Maroons won the game 9–7, which was considered a major win for professional football, but the match only attracted about 8,000 fans, a major financial disappointment. As threatened, Carr suspended Pottsville and removed them from the NFL, preventing them from finishing their schedule.

Meanwhile, Chicago Cardinals owner Chris O'Brien hastily scheduled two games against the Hammond Pros and the Milwaukee Badgers, both of whom had already disbanded for the season. O'Brien's intention appears not to have been to secure the championship, but to improve their record so as to entice the Chicago Bears and their star Red Grange into one last game. The game against the Badgers spurred a scandal of its own, when the Badgers filled out their roster with four high school players, in contravention of NFL rules. Both teams were sanctioned by the league. Regardless, with Pottsville out of the league, the Cardinals had the best record, and were awarded the championship by the league. For his part, O'Brien refused to accept the title, and afterward the league never officially awarded it at all. Later both the franchise and the NFL would claim the Cardinals as the 1925 champions. The Cardinals did not attempt to publicly take credit for the title until 1933, when it was acquired by Charles Bidwill whose descendants still own the modern-day franchise (since relocated to St. Louis and now Arizona). The Cardinals have won only one further NFL title, in 1947, leading to discussion that the franchise is "cursed" as a result of the debacle.

Return to the NFL
The NFL reinstated the Maroons the very next season. The league feared that the Maroons would jump to the threatening American Football League. In 1926 Red Grange and his manager C. C. Pyle wanted an NFL franchise in New York City. However, that move would have infringed on the territorial rights of the New York Giants. Pyle and Grange were turned down, so they decided to start their own league, the AFL. To keep independent teams from joining Grange's league, the NFL hastily expanded to 22 franchises. The Maroons were one of the teams added, or in this case reinstated. That year the Maroons were once again in the thick of title contention until late in the season. Pottsville's shutout victories over the Buffalo Rangers and Akron Indians led to the team finishing with a 10–2–1 record and third place in the final standings. 1926 also saw the signing of George Kenneally, a rookie out of St. Bonaventure University, who earned all-pro status and was named team captain in just his second season, and would later become part owner of the club.

However, towards the end of the season, the Maroons management struggled to meet its financial obligations, and there were published reports of a strike among the team's players.

The 1927 season saw a decline in the team's on-field performance. Pottsville lost several of its stars, and others were growing older, and finished the season with a disappointing 5–8–0 record. Doc Striegel relinquished operational control of the team for the 1928 season by "loaning" it to a group of three players: Herb Stein, Pete Henry and Duke Osborn. Henry took over the coaching reins but the downward spiral continued. The Maroons ended what turned out to be their final season in Pottsville with a dismal 2–8–0 record. At the end of the season the players were given a small football made of anthracite coal, a memento of the last season played in Pottsville.

Boston Bulldogs

Striegel sold the club during the offseason to a New England-based partnership that included Maroons' standout, George Kenneally. The new owners relocated the franchise to Boston prior to the 1929 season, where it was renamed the Bulldogs. The Bulldogs would be the first of a string of unsuccessful attempts at establishing an NFL team in Massachusetts and would be followed by the Boston Redskins in the 1930s and the Boston Yanks in the 1940s. Not until the American Football League's Patriots (established in 1960) joined the NFL in 1970 would the league be able to establish a permanent presence in New England's most populous market (and even that team required a hostile takeover to prevent being relocated in the 1990s).

Six veteran Maroons players made the move with the team. Dick Rauch also returned to the fold, resuming his position as head coach. Based at Boston's Braves Field, the Bulldogs nonetheless had a two-game swan song in their old stomping grounds, defeating both the Buffalo Bison on October 27 at Minersville Park and the Orange Tornadoes on October 29 at Mitchell Field. The team folded at season's end with a 4–4–0 record.

Because the Washington Redskins began in 1932 as the Boston Braves, some Pottsville backers, with help from a few writers, have suggested that the team descended from the Maroons by way of the Boston Bulldogs. The 1932 Boston franchise, however, had no relationship to the 1929 Bulldogs (that team instead descended from the Tornadoes, by way of the 1931 Cleveland Indians).

Today

In 1963, the NFL created a special committee to investigate the 1925 controversy. The committee brought the Maroons' claim to a team owners meeting that year, where the owners voted 12–2 in favor of keeping the championship with the Cardinals. That same year, the surviving members of the Maroons carved their own championship trophy out of coal, and presented it to the Pro Football Hall of Fame, where it can be seen today. 

The 1925 Maroons have since been immortalized in Pottsville, where there are bars and establishments bearing the team's name, and an inspirational picture of the 1925 "World Champion" team is displayed in the high school football team's locker room. 

In 2003, the NFL decided to address, via a vote during an owners meeting on whether the league should re-examine the case regarding the 1925 championship; in October, the NFL voted 30–2 not to reopen the case. Thus, the Cardinals are still listed as the 1925 NFL champions.

Today, the people of Pottsville still embrace the legacy of the Maroons. The town contains the headquarters of the Pottsville Maroons Memorial Committee, whose job it is to keep alive the spirit of Pottsville's only big-league sports franchise. In Pottsville, there was a major push led by Mayor John D.W. Reiley to restore the Maroons' 1925 title. The owner of a local embroidery shop still makes Maroons T-shirts and distributes them to residents and fans. In 2003, Pennsylvania Governor Ed Rendell got involved in the Pottsville-NFL debate, lobbying NFL owners and asking city and borough councils across the state to lobby the league to restore the Maroons' title.

Despite the long-time backing of Bears founder George Halas, Steelers founder Art Rooney and, more recently, Steelers chairman Dan Rooney, Philadelphia Eagles owner Jeff Lurie, the Pennsylvania General Assembly, and former commissioner Paul Tagliabue, the NFL's other owners, led, not surprisingly, by the Cardinals, still continue to vote this down (30–2).

Also in 2003, U.S. President George W. Bush spoke on the subject. According to an article in ESPN the Magazine, Bush sent a handwritten note to ESPN calling the Maroons' case "illuminating."

After a 2003 vote in favor of keeping the 1925 title with the Cardinals, Rendell wrote an angry letter to Tagliabue, calling the NFL owners a group of "cowardly barons". Rendell berated the National Football League, and declared he would have no more communication with league officials until they granted the Pottsville Maroons the 1925 title. The governor ended the letter saying, "I am closing with the wish that every NFL franchise except for the Eagles and the Steelers lose large quantities of money".

In 2006 David Fleming authored the book Breaker Boys: The NFL's Greatest Team and the Stolen 1925 Championship.

In 2008, USA Today statistician Jeff Sagarin analyzed the two teams' statistics, including considerations for strength of schedule to determine which was the better team in 1925. The results showed the Maroons as the better team to the second-place Cardinals.

Pro Football Hall of Famers

Season by season

References
 Pottsville Maroons Sports Bar – Maroons history as told by the owner.
 Pottsville Maroons, Ghosts of the Gridiron
 Total Football: The Official Encyclopedia of the National Football League
 1925 Pottsville Maroons, Professional Football Reference (URL last accessed September 30, 2006)
 1925 Chicago Cardinals, Professional Football Reference (URL last accessed September 30, 2006)
 Pottsville Maroons, Professional Football Reference
 "Lost in Time" by David Fleming

Notes

 
American football teams established in 1920
American football teams disestablished in 1929
Defunct National Football League teams
History of Pennsylvania
Defunct American football teams in Pennsylvania
Anthracite League teams
Pottsville, Pennsylvania
1920 establishments in Pennsylvania
1929 disestablishments in Massachusetts